The  Dallas Cowboys season was the franchise's 27th season in the National Football League. The team finished the regular season at 7–9 and finishing with a losing record for the first time since 1964.

Summary
The Cowboys, re-invigorated by the off-season acquisitions of running back Herschel Walker and passing coordinator Paul Hackett, got off to a strong 6–2 start, including a season opening win on Monday night over the eventual Super Bowl champion New York Giants, which saw Walker score the winning touchdown late in the game, and a 30–6 blowout win over the Washington Redskins, which ended the Redskins 5–0 start. Quarterbacks Danny White and Steve Pelluer played well early in the season under Hackett's tutelage, who was brought over from the San Francisco 49ers to breathe new life into the passing game. However, White broke his wrist on a sack by Carl Banks during a crucial loss to the New York Giants, and was ruled out for the season. Pelluer took over as the starting quarterback, and struggled mightily, throwing 17 interceptions over the course of the season, as well as seeing constant pressure from opposing pass rushers, including being sacked a team record twelve times in a game against San Diego. The Cowboys lost seven out of their final eight games, and suffered a five-game losing streak to close out the season, including embarrassing losses to the Redskins (41–14) and the Seahawks in the annual Thanksgiving Day game (31–14). It was the Cowboys' first loss on Thanksgiving since 1979. During the third quarter of a late-season loss to the Los Angeles Rams, Tom Landry was forced to leave the field due to a threat against his life. Landry returned to the field later in the game wearing a bulletproof vest.

The Cowboys undoing certainly wasn't because of an inability to move the football, as the team ranked fourth in the NFL in total offense. Running back Herschel Walker rushed for 737 yards, caught 76 passes for 837 yards, and scored 14 touchdowns. Late in the season against the Eagles, Walker had a combined 292 yards rushing and receiving, breaking the team single game record. Running back Tony Dorsett added 748 yards rushing, and even though he was still the team's starting running back, he was clearly unhappy with his reduced role. This was the first non-strike season he hadn't rushed for 1,000 yards. The passing game flourished under Danny White early in the year, but following White's injury, turnovers and an inability to protect the quarterback neutralized the passing attack. Wide receiver Tony Hill and tight end Doug Cosbie both began to show their age, and Mike Renfro was limited because of injury. Rookie wide receiver Mike Sherrard provided a deep threat, gaining 744 yards on just 41 receptions. Defensively, the team struggled to stop the run, finishing 23rd against the run, and the secondary, an opportunistic bunch in past seasons, only intercepted 17 passes during the season. The pass rush was still strong, despite defensive tackle Randy White finally beginning to slow down due to age and injury, as fourth year defensive end Jim Jeffcoat stepped up with 14 sacks. Overall, it was mistakes that would plague the team throughout the 1986 season. The offensive line gave up 60 sacks, the offense turned the ball over 41 times, and the team committed 112 penalties.

No Cowboys were selected for the Pro Bowl in 1986.

Offseason

NFL Draft

Roster

Regular season

Schedule

Division opponents are in bold text

Standings

Game summaries

Week 1: vs. New York Giants
Herschel Walker could have arrived at a better time, with Tony Dorsett sidelined with a first half ankle injury, Walker ended his NFL debut by scoring a game-winning touchdown on a 10-yard run with 1:16 to play against the Giants.
It was Walker's 2nd TD of the night-a Monday Night in which he ran for 64 yards on 10 tries. Dorsett opened the scoring on a 36-yard toss from Danny White in the second quarter, but New York rallies from 14-0 and 24–21 to claim a 28–24 lead on Phil Simms' third TD pass with 5:24 remaining. Simms threw for 300 yards, but it was Walker having arrived from the USFL that made the difference for Dallas.

Week 9: at New York Giants

Week 10: vs. Los Angeles Raiders

 
 
 
 
 
 

Dokie Williams 5 Rec, 107 Yds

Week 13: vs. Seattle Seahawks

Awards
For the first time in team history, the Cowboys had no players chosen to play in the Pro Bowl. They also had no players mentioned on the Associated Press' All-NFL team.

Publications
 The Football Encyclopedia 
 Total Football 
 Cowboys Have Always Been My Heroes

References

External links
 1986 Dallas Cowboys
 Pro Football Hall of Fame
 Dallas Cowboys Official Site

Dallas Cowboys seasons
Dallas
Dallas